Aln, ALN, or AlN may refer to:

Organizations

Paramilitary 
 Ação Libertadora Nacional, a Brazilian Marxist–Leninist guerrilla movement
 Armée de Libération Nationale, the armed wing of the nationalist National Liberation Front of Algeria during the Algerian War

Political 
 Africa Liberal Network, an organization of political parties in Africa
 Alianza Liberal Nicaragüense, a political party in Nicaragua
 Nationalist Liberation Alliance (Alianza Libertadora Nacionalista, ALN), Argentine fascist movement
 Action libérale nationale, a short-lived political party in Canada

Transportation 
 Althorne railway station, England, station code ALN
 Alton station (Illinois), U.S., station code ALN
 St. Louis Regional Airport, Illinois, U.S., IATA airport code ALN

Other uses
 River Aln, England
 Aln, a historic Swedish unit of measurement
 Aluminium nitride
 AmericanLife TV Network
 ALN Magazine
 Gheg Albanian, ISO 639-3 language code aln

See also